In the mathematical field of differential topology, the Hopf fibration (also known as the Hopf bundle or Hopf map) describes a 3-sphere (a hypersphere in four-dimensional space) in terms of circles and an ordinary sphere. Discovered by Heinz Hopf in 1931, it is an influential early example of a fiber bundle. Technically, Hopf found a many-to-one continuous function (or "map") from the -sphere onto the -sphere such that each distinct point of the -sphere is mapped from a distinct great circle of the -sphere . Thus the -sphere is composed of fibers, where each fiber is a circle — one for each point of the -sphere.

This fiber bundle structure is denoted

The Hopf fibration, like any fiber bundle, has the important property that it is locally a product space.

This has many implications: for example the existence of this bundle shows that the higher homotopy groups of spheres are not trivial in general. It also provides a basic example of a principal bundle, by identifying the fiber with the circle group.

Here each fiber projects to a circle in space (one of which is a line, thought of as a "circle through infinity"). Each torus is the stereographic projection of the inverse image of a circle of latitude of the -sphere. (Topologically, a torus is the product of two circles.) These tori are illustrated in the images at right. When  is compressed to the boundary of a ball, some geometric structure is lost although the topological structure is retained (see Topology and geometry). The loops are homeomorphic to circles, although they are not geometric circles.

There are numerous generalizations of the Hopf fibration. The unit sphere in complex coordinate space  fibers naturally over the complex projective space  with circles as fibers, and there are also real, quaternionic, and octonionic versions of these fibrations. In particular, the Hopf fibration belongs to a family of four fiber bundles in which the total space, base space, and fiber space are all spheres:

By  Adams's theorem such fibrations can occur only in these dimensions.

The Hopf fibration is important in twistor theory.

Definition and construction

For any natural number n, an n-dimensional sphere, or n-sphere, can be defined as the set of points in an -dimensional space which are a fixed distance from a central point. For concreteness, the central point can be taken to be the origin, and the distance of the points on the sphere from this origin can be assumed to be a unit length. For example, the -sphere consists of the points (x1, x2, x3, x4) in R4 with x12 + x22 + x32 + x42 = 1.

The Hopf fibration  of the -sphere over the -sphere can be defined in several ways.

Direct construction

and

.

(Here, for a complex number , where the star denotes the complex conjugate.) Then the Hopf fibration  is defined by

The first component is a complex number, whereas the second component is real. Any point on the -sphere must have  the property that .

The converse is also true; any two points on the -sphere that differ by a common complex factor  map to the same point on the -sphere. These conclusions follow, because the complex factor  cancels with its complex conjugate  in both parts of : in the complex  component and in the real component .

Thus the -sphere is realized as a disjoint union of these circular fibers.

A direct parametrization of the -sphere employing the Hopf map is as follows.

or in Euclidean 

Geometric interpretation using the complex projective line

Alternatively, the point  can be mapped to the ratio  in the Riemann sphere .

Fiber bundle structure

The Hopf fibration defines a fiber bundle, with bundle projection . Such a fibration is said to be locally trivial.

Geometric interpretation using rotations

Another geometric interpretation of the Hopf fibration can be obtained by considering rotations of the -sphere in ordinary -dimensional space. The rotation group SO(3) has a double cover, the spin group , diffeomorphic to the -sphere. The stabilizer of a point is isomorphic to the circle group. It follows easily that the -sphere is a principal circle bundle over the -sphere, and this is the Hopf fibration.

To make this more explicit, there are two approaches: the group  can either be identified with the group Sp(1) of unit quaternions, or with the special unitary group SU(2).

On the other hand, a vector  in  can be interpreted as a pure quaternion

Then, as is well-known since , the mapping

is a rotation in : indeed it is clearly an isometry, since , and it is not hard to check that it preserves orientation.

This is a circle subgroup. For concreteness, one can take , and then the Hopf fibration can be defined as the map sending a versor . All the quaternions , where  is one of the circle of versors that fix , get mapped to the same thing (which happens to be one of the two  rotations rotating  to the same place as  does).

Any quaternion , where  is one of the circle of versors that fix , will have the same effect.

This approach is related to the direct construction by identifying a quaternion  with the  matrix:

Explicit formulae

The rotation induced by a unit quaternion  is given explicitly by the orthogonal matrix

Here we find an explicit real formula for the bundle projection by noting that the fixed unit vector along the  axis, rotates to another unit vector,

The fiber for a given point on  consists of all those unit quaternions that send the unit vector there.

Multiplication of unit quaternions produces composition of rotations, and

is a rotation by  around the  axis. So long as the base point, is not the antipode, the quaternion

Since multiplication by  acts as a rotation of quaternion space, the fiber is not merely a topological circle, it is a geometric circle.

which completes the bundle.

Thus, a simple way of visualizing the Hopf fibration is as follows.  Any point on the -sphere is equivalent to a quaternion, which in turn is equivalent to a particular rotation of a Cartesian coordinate frame in three dimensions.  The set of all possible quaternions produces the set of all possible rotations, which moves the tip of one unit vector of such a coordinate frame (say, the  vector) to all possible points on a unit -sphere.  However, fixing the tip of the  vector does not specify the rotation fully; a further rotation is possible about the axis.  Thus, the -sphere is mapped onto the -sphere, plus a single rotation.

The rotation can be represented using the Euler angles θ, φ, and ψ. The Hopf mapping maps the rotation to the point on the 2-sphere given by θ and φ, and the associated circle is parametrized by ψ. Note that when θ = π the Euler angles φ and ψ are not well defined individually, so we do not have a one-to-one mapping (or a one-to-two mapping) between the 3-torus of (θ, φ, ψ) and S3.

Fluid mechanics

If the Hopf fibration is treated as a vector field in 3 dimensional space then there is a solution to the (compressible, non-viscous) Navier–Stokes equations of fluid dynamics in which the fluid flows along the circles of the projection of the Hopf fibration in 3 dimensional space. The size of the velocities, the density and the pressure can be chosen at each point to satisfy the equations. All these quantities fall to zero going away from the centre. If a is the distance to the inner ring, the velocities, pressure and density fields are given by:

Similar patterns of fields are found as soliton solutions of magnetohydrodynamics:

Generalizations

The Hopf construction, viewed as a fiber bundle p: S3 → CP1, admits several generalizations, which are also often known as Hopf fibrations. First, one can replace the projective line by an n-dimensional projective space. Second, one can replace the complex numbers by any (real) division algebra, including (for n = 1) the octonions.

Real Hopf fibrations

A real version of the Hopf fibration is obtained by regarding the circle S1 as a subset of R2 in the usual way and by
identifying antipodal points. This gives a fiber bundle S1 → RP1  over the real projective line with fiber S0 = {1, −1}. Just as CP1 is diffeomorphic to a sphere, RP1 is diffeomorphic to a circle.

More generally, the n-sphere Sn fibers over real projective space RPn with fiber S0.

Complex Hopf fibrations

The Hopf construction gives circle bundles p : S2n+1 → CPn over complex projective space. This is actually the restriction of the tautological line bundle over CPn to the unit sphere in Cn+1.

Quaternionic Hopf fibrations

Similarly, one can regard S4n+3 as lying in Hn+1 (quaternionic n-space) and factor out by unit quaternion (= S3) multiplication to get the quaternionic projective space HPn.  In particular, since S4 = HP1, there is a bundle S7 → S4 with fiber S3.

Octonionic Hopf fibrations

A similar construction with the octonions yields a bundle S15 → S8 with fiber S7. But the sphere S31 does not fiber over S16 with fiber S15. One can regard S8 as the octonionic projective line OP1. Although one can also define an octonionic projective plane OP2, the sphere S23 does not fiber over OP2
with fiber S7.

Fibrations between spheres

Sometimes the term "Hopf fibration" is restricted to the fibrations between spheres obtained above, which are
 S1 → S1 with fiber S0
 S3 → S2 with fiber S1
 S7 → S4 with fiber S3
 S15 → S8 with fiber S7
As a consequence of  Adams's theorem, fiber bundles with spheres as total space, base space, and fiber can occur only in these dimensions. 
Fiber bundles with similar properties, but different from the Hopf fibrations, were used by John Milnor to construct exotic spheres.

Geometry and applications

The Hopf fibration has many implications, some purely attractive, others deeper. For example, stereographic projection S3 → R3 induces a remarkable structure in R3, which in turn illuminates the topology of the bundle . Stereographic projection preserves circles and maps the Hopf fibers to geometrically perfect circles in R3 which fill space. Here there is one exception: the Hopf circle containing the projection point maps to a straight line in R3 — a "circle through infinity".

The fibers over a circle of latitude on S2 form a torus in S3 (topologically, a torus is the product of two circles) and these project to nested toruses in R3 which also fill space. The individual fibers map to linking Villarceau circles on these tori, with the exception of the circle through the projection point and the one through its opposite point: the former maps to a straight line, the latter to a unit circle perpendicular to, and centered on, this line, which may be viewed as a degenerate torus whose minor radius has shrunken to zero. Every other fiber image encircles the line as well, and so, by symmetry, each circle is linked through every circle, both in R3 and in S3. Two such linking circles form a Hopf link in R3

Hopf proved that the Hopf map has Hopf invariant 1, and therefore is not null-homotopic. In fact it generates the homotopy group π3(S2) and has infinite order.

In quantum mechanics, the Riemann sphere is known as the Bloch sphere, and the Hopf fibration describes the topological structure of a quantum mechanical two-level system or qubit. Similarly, the topology of a pair of entangled two-level systems is given by the Hopf fibration 

. Moreover, the Hopf fibration is equivalent to the fiber bundle structure of the Dirac monopole.

Hopf fibration also found applications in robotics, where it was used to generate uniform samples on SO(3) for the probabilistic roadmap algorithm in motion planning. It also found application in the automatic control of quadrotors.

Notes

References
 ; reprinted as article 20 in 
 
 
 
.

External links
 
 Dimensions Math Chapters 7  and 8 illustrate the Hopf fibration with animated computer graphics.
 An Elementary Introduction to the Hopf Fibration by David W. Lyons (PDF)
 YouTube animation showing dynamic mapping of points on the 2-sphere to circles in the 3-sphere, by Professor Niles Johnson.
 YouTube animation of the construction of the 120-cell  By Gian Marco Todesco shows the Hopf fibration of the 120-cell.
 Video of one 30-cell ring of the 600-cell from http://page.math.tu-berlin.de/~gunn/.
 Interactive visualization of the mapping of points on the 2-sphere to circles in the 3-sphere

Algebraic topology
Geometric topology
Differential geometry
Fiber bundles
Homotopy theory